The 2002–03 season saw Southend United's compete in the Football League Third Division.

Final league table

Results

Legend

Football League Third Division

FA Cup

League Cup

League Trophy

Squad statistics

References
 Southend 2002–03 at statto.com 
 Player information sourced from The English National Football Archive

2002–03
Southend United